The Hopetoun Cup was established as a perpetual rugby union trophy between Australia and Scotland in 1998. In the spirit of the link between the two countries, it is named for John Hope, 7th Earl of Hopetoun (1860–1908), a Scotsman, who, as the then Governor-General of Australia, presided over the Federation of Australia in 1901.  Like the Cook Cup, the Hopetoun Cup is crystal and was designed by Royal Doulton in London.

Australia are the current holders, ending Scotland's winning run of three victories in 2022, dating back to 2017. Scotland won back-to-back 24–19 in Sydney, 53–24 in Edinburgh in 2017, and Edinburgh again 15–13 in 2021. Australia have held the cup for the majority of its existence. However, in 2009 and 2012, Scotland recorded back-to-back wins to hold the cup for four years.

Matches

Results
 – Summer Test
 – Autumn International

See also

History of rugby union matches between Australia and Scotland
Lansdowne Cup

References

External links

Rugby union international rivalry trophies
History of rugby union matches between Australia and Scotland
International rugby union competitions hosted by Australia
International rugby union competitions hosted by Scotland
1998 establishments in Australia
1998 establishments in Scotland